Bicol Saro is a political party in the Philippines. Based in the Bicol Region, it is currently an organization with party-list representation in the House of Representatives of the Philippines.

History
Bicol Saro is among the parties that vied for a seat in the Interim Batasang Pambansa in the 1978 parliamentary election.

In 2019, Bicol Saro entered into a partnership with the Hugpong ng Pagbabago (HNP) party.

It later ran as a party-list organization. It currently has a seat in the House of Representatives' 19th Congress after their campaign in the 2022 elections. Their campaign was aided by an endorsement from actress Nora Aunor.

The seat is filled by Nicolas Enciso VIII, who was previously a nominee for the 1-Pacman Party List and a former deputy-director general of the Technical Education and Skills Development Authority.

Representatives to Congress

External links

References

Party-lists represented in the House of Representatives of the Philippines
Regionalist parties in the Philippines